Matt Pilar Dominguez (born June 27, 1978) is a former gridiron football wide receiver. He was originally signed by the Denver Broncos as an undrafted free agent in 2002. He played college football at Sam Houston State.

Dominguez was also a member of the New York Jets and Saskatchewan Roughriders. He won a Grey Cup with the Roughriders in the 2007 Saskatchewan Roughriders season.

Dominguez along with then teammate Gene Makowsky made a cameo appearance in the Corner Gas episode "Reader Pride".

Coaching
Offensive Co-Ordinator 
Riffel High School 2007-2010
Offensive Co-ordinator 
Central High School 2010-2013
Offensive Assistant/Wide Receivers Coach
Saskatchewan Selects 2020

College career
Dominguez attended Sam Houston State for college where he was the team's MVP twice and the school's first NCAA division I-AA All-American.

Professional career

Denver Broncos
Dominguez spent time on the Denver Broncos practice squad and played in 12 games with 3 receptions for 27 yards, his first catch came against the Seattle Seahawks on October 14, 2001.

First stint with Roughriders
After being released Dominguez was signed by the Roughriders in 2003 and quickly used his size to his advantage and became a fan favourite by gaining over 1,000 yards in his first year.

New York Jets
In 2004 Dominguez signed with the New York Jets of the National Football League. He was cut at the end of training camp.

Second stint with Roughriders
In 2005, Dominguez tore ligaments in his knee and was lost for the season after two games. Dominguez runs a football camp in Saskatchewan and spends his off-season in Regina with his wife Jennifer and his sons Matthew the 2nd and Marcel and daughter Victoria. He won the 95th Grey Cup in the 2007 CFL season with the Saskatchewan Roughriders.

Dominguez was released by the Roughriders on February 13, 2009, days before he was due a bonus payment and other incentives with two years remaining on his contract.

References

External links 
Saskatchewan Roughriders bio

1978 births
Living people
American football wide receivers
Canadian football wide receivers
Denver Broncos players
People from Georgetown, Texas
Sam Houston Bearkats football players
Saskatchewan Roughriders players